Chang'an Town is an industrial town in the south east of the Dongguan prefecture-level city in the Pearl River Delta of Guangdong Province, China. By 2021, according to the local government, the permanent population of Chang'an is 807,400.

Economy
There are many manufacturing operations which tailor to the needs of the export industry, and as a result, Chang'an is one of the wealthiest districts in all of China.  As Dongguan is an odd agglomeration of towns without a central core (multicore), the town is more economically connected to adjacent Shenzhen than the far smaller and less dynamic urban cores of Dongguan.

Transportation

State Highway 107, Guangshen Expressway G4 and Guangshen Yanjiang Expressway S3 run through the area.

References

External links

Geography of Dongguan
Towns in Guangdong